The Olkaria V Geothermal Power Station, also known as the Olkaria V Geothermal Power Plant is a power station in Kenya, with an electric capacity of .

Location
The geographical coordinates of the power station are:00°54'59.0"S, 36°21'02.0"E (Latitude:-0.906944; Longitude:36.323333).

Overview
The power station is jointly financed by the Japan International Cooperation Agency (JICA) and the Kenya Electricity Generating Company (KenGen). The budgeted cost is Sh40 billion (US$400 million).

A consortium of two Japanese firms and one Kenyan company, was selected to provide the necessary equipment and build the power plant. Mitsubishi Corporation supplied the main equipment. Mitsubishi Hitachi Power Systems transported the equipment from the port of Mombasa to the construction site at Olkaria and installed the machinery. H Young & Company (HY), a Kenyan outfit, supplied the remaining parts required to construct the power station. HY was also responsible for civil engineering works and installation of the parts that they provide.

The Olkaria V plant in Great Rift Valley, Kenya was first synchronized to the National Grid on 28 June 2019 and its first unit has reached its full design output of 79 megawatts. A second unit came online in October 2019, bringing Kenya's total geothermal capacity to between 700MW and 850MW.

History
Olkaria 5 power plant is another in a series of six geothermal stations either planned or already operational in the Olkaria area in Nakuru County. Construction began in April 2017. Completion and commercial power production began in 2019.

Ownership
Olkaria V Geothermal Power Station is wholly owned by the Kenya Electricity Generating Company (KenGen).

See also

List of power stations in Kenya
Geothermal power in Kenya
Olkaria I Geothermal Power Station
Olkaria II Geothermal Power Station
Olkaria III Geothermal Power Station
Olkaria IV Geothermal Power Station

References

External links
Mitsubishi Corporation to Construct Geothermal Plant in Kenya
  Olkaria PPP Investor Conference 140MW PPP Geothermal Project 27th November, 2019.

Geothermal power stations in Kenya
Nakuru County
Energy infrastructure completed in 2019
Buildings and structures completed in 2019
2019 establishments in Kenya